Tetracis jubararia is a moth of the family Geometridae. It is found in North America (see subspecies section).

The length of the forewings 17–26 mm. Adults of ssp. jubararia are on wing from mid August to late November depending upon locality and elevation. Adults of ssp. sericeata are on wing from September to mid November.

Larvae of ssp. jubararia have been recorded on Alnus, Betula, Cornus,
Populus, Ribes, Prunus subcordata, Salix, Picea glauca, Picea engelmanni, Pseudotsuga menziesii and Thuja.

Subspecies
Tetracis jubararia jubararia (southern California northward to British Columbia and eastward to central Saskatchewan, southwestern Idaho, and White Pine County, Nevada at elevations from 150 to 2255 meters)
Tetracis jubararia sericeata (Rocky Mountain and Intermountain Regions from 1,830 to 2,590 meters)

External links
Revision of the North American genera Tetracis Guenée and synonymization of Synaxis Hulst with descriptions of three new species (Lepidoptera: Geometridae: Ennominae)

Tetracis
Moths described in 1886